Enadenotucirev is an investigational oncolytic virus that is in clinical trials for various cancers.

It is an oncolytic A11/Ad3 Chimeric Group B Adenovirus, previously described as ColoAd1.

Enadenotucirev has also been modified with additional genes using the tumor-specific immuno-gene therapy (T-SIGn) platform to develop novel cancer gene therapy agents.

The T-SIGn vectors at clinical study stage are:
 NG-350A: This vector contains two transgenes expressing the heavy and light chains for a secreted CD40 agonist monoclonal antibody.
 NG-641: This vector contains four transgenes expressing secreted Interferon alpha, the chemokines CXCL9, CXCL10 and an anti-FAP/anti-CD3 bispecific T-cell activator

In Jan 2015 the European Medicines Agency's (EMA) Committee for Orphan Medical Products (COMP) designated enadenotucirev as an orphan medicinal product for the treatment of ovarian cancer.

Clinical trials
Two clinical trials have been completed with enadenotucirev. The EVOLVE study  and the MOA study.

, there are two active phase 1 trials: OCTAVE (in ovarian cancer) and SPICE (in multiple solid tumor indications) 

Of the T-SIGn viruses, NG-350A has an ongoing clinical study.

See also
 Oncolytic adenovirus
 Oncolytic adenovirus#Directed Evolution

References

Adenoviridae
Biotechnology
Experimental cancer treatments
Virotherapy